Swiss lemonade or limonada suíça is a type of Brazilian lemonade made of lime pieces with peel, ice cubes, sugar, and water. The ingredients are usually beaten together in a blender and then strained. There are several versions of this drink, including one with condensed milk.

The word lemonade is used since lime is known as Tahitian lemon in Brazil.

See also 
 List of Brazilian drinks
 Lemonade

References

Brazilian cuisine